Frederick Eccleston (3 March 1905 – 10 November 1988) was an Australian cricketer. He played two first-class matches for Bengal between 1939 and 1946.

See also
 List of Bengal cricketers

References

External links
 

1905 births
1988 deaths
Australian cricketers
Bengal cricketers
Cricketers from Lucknow
Europeans cricketers